"If You Really Love Me" is a song written by Stevie Wonder and Syreeta Wright. Wonder recorded the song and released his version as a single from his 1971 album Where I'm Coming From. The single peaked in the top 10 of the Billboard Hot 100 (number 8), Billboard′s R&B chart (number 4), and Billboard′s Easy Listening chart (number 10).

Background
The song was one of the last to feature Motown's background band the Funk Brothers. After its release, Wonder left the Hitsville USA studios to record in New York City, playing most of the instruments himself. Wonder played Moog bass synthesizer, drums, and piano on "If You Really Love Me", while Wright is featured in the background singing.

Cash Box said of it that "Wonder, via superb use of dynamics and fine mood changes will bring this tune to national attention."

Personnel
Stevie Wonder – lead and background vocals; arrangement, instrumentation; production 
Syreeta Wright – background vocals
The Funk Brothers – instrumentation
David Van De Pitte – arrangement

Chart performance

Weekly charts

Year-end charts

References

External links
 

Stevie Wonder songs
1971 singles
Songs written by Stevie Wonder
Songs written by Syreeta Wright
Motown singles
Tamla Records singles
1971 songs